Agdistis murgabica is a moth of the family Pterophoridae. It is found in central Asia.

References

Moths described in 1994
Agdistinae